Aayiram Muthangaludan Thenmozhi is a 2012 Indian Tamil-language romantic drama film directed by Shanmugarajan and starring Venkatesh and Akshara.

Cast 
Venkatesh as Ramesh
Akshara (Sharanya Turadi Sundaraj) as Thenmozhi

Production 
The director Shanmugharajan, an associate of Cheran, used seventy one newcomers as actors for the film. A month long training camp was set up before the film began shooting. Each of the film's sixty-two scenes were each shot individually in a single shot, which was the trial shot. The shots were then edited and reshot.

Soundtrack 
The songs were composed by Taj Noor.
"Satham Sathamindri" - written by Tharangai Surya  sung by Swetha.
"Karaikkal" written by the director and sung by Harish Iyer and Hemambika
"Palodu Thaen Sera" - written by Yugabharathi and sung by Raheeb Aalam and Rajalakshmi.
"Dan Dan Dan" - written by Gnanakaravel and sung by Velmurugan, Ananthu and A. R. Reihana.
"Un Peyer Enna,' written by Uvari Sukumar and sung by Niwas. 
"My Dear Purusha" written by Eknath and sung by Ananthu, Priyadarshini and Shanmugaraj.
"Theendatha Theeyai" -  written by Gnanakaravel and sung by Karthik and Padmalatha.

Reception 
A critic from The Times of India wrote that "To be fair to Venkatesh and Akshara, they have ably delivered what was demanded of them. They are unfortunately let down by a poor screenplay". A critic from Behindwoods wrote that "Director Shanmugaraj has been successful in portraying how small issues turn into bigger ones in a relationship. But, the problem is that film is full of these small issues only". A critic from Nowrunning wrote that "Director Shanmugharaj has a trove of the most ridiculous ideas. It's ridiculous to the point of being original; maybe even, creative".

References 

2010s Tamil-language films